Valdemar Bandolowski (born 17 February 1946 in Esbønderup) is a Danish sailor and Olympic champion.

He won a gold medal in the Soling Class at the 1976 Summer Olympics in Montreal, and again at the 1980 Summer Olympics in Moscow.

References

External links
 
 
 

1946 births
Living people
Danish male sailors (sport)
Danish people of Polish descent
European Champions Soling
Medalists at the 1976 Summer Olympics
Medalists at the 1980 Summer Olympics
Olympic gold medalists for Denmark
Olympic medalists in sailing
Olympic sailors of Denmark
People from Gribskov Municipality
Sailors at the 1972 Summer Olympics – Soling
Sailors at the 1976 Summer Olympics – Soling
Sailors at the 1980 Summer Olympics – Soling
Soling class world champions
Sportspeople from the Capital Region of Denmark